Tasty Life is a 2012 South Korean television series starring Im Chae-moo, Yoon Jung-hee, Ryu Hyun-kyung, Yoo Da-in and Lee Hye-ri. The series written by Kim Jung-eun and directed by Woon Goon-il is about four daughters of a wealthy father, who fall in love, marry, and go through the ups and downs in life. It aired on SBS from April 28 to September 23, 2012 on Saturdays and Sundays at 20:40 for 39 episodes.

Plot
Jang Shin-jo was once a police detective, but has now switched from carrying a gun to wielding a kitchen knife as a restaurant owner. He is also an adoring father with four daughters.

Cast
Im Chae-moo as Jang Shin-jo
Yoon Jung-hee as Jang Seung-joo
Ryu Hyun-kyung as Jang Jung-hyun
Yoo Da-in as Jang Joo-hyun
Lee Hye-ri as Jang Mi-hyun

Han Bong-soon's family
Yoon Mi-ra as Han Bong-soon
Ye Ji-won as Oh Jin-joo
Lee Mid-eum as Oh Bong

Choi In-goo's family
Park Geun-hyung as Choi In-goo
Won Jong-rye - Hwang Geum-sook
Choi Won-young as Kang In-chul
Yoo Yeon-seok as Choi Jae-hyuk
Yoo Seo-jin as Choi Shin-young

Min Yong-ki's family
Kim Hak-chul as Min Yong-ki
Lee Eung-kyung as Jo Hye-ran
Jung Joon as Min Tae-hyung
Clara Lee as Min Young-woo

Extended cast
Ahn Suk-hwan as Jo Pyung-goo
Park Yoon-jae as Lee Jae-bok
Lee Eun-hee as Lee Hyo-ri
Choi Kwon as Bae Sam-bong
Yeom Hyun-seo as Jo Mi-so
Kim Min-gook as Han Min-gook
Hong Sung-sook as Kang Yoo-kyung
Seok Jin-yi as Kim Hee-soo
Kim Re-ah as Lee Young-hee
Bae Jang-hwan as Kim Hwan
Jung Yoo-seok as Hong Seok-goo
Heo Joon-seok as Tae-kwon
Han Sung-yong as Choon-bae
Kang Chang-mook as chauffeur
Kim Joon-hyung as Seo Hyung-jin
Kim Ja-ok
Jeon Jin-seo as Kid in a coma

References

External links
Tasty Life official SBS website 

Seoul Broadcasting System television dramas
2012 South Korean television series debuts
2012 South Korean television series endings
Korean-language television shows
Television series set in restaurants
South Korean romantic comedy television series
South Korean cooking television series
Television series by JS Pictures